Chris Mavinga-Adebayor (born 26 May 1991) is a professional footballer who plays as a centre-back for the LA Galaxy in Major League Soccer. A French youth international, who was a part of the team that won the 2010 UEFA European Under-19 Championship on home soil, he has chosen to represent DR Congo at senior level.

Mavinga joined Rubin Kazan in 2013 after spending two years at French club Rennes. Prior to joining Rennes, he spent three years at the Camp des Loges, the training center of French club Paris Saint-Germain and also two years with Liverpool.

Club career

Early career

Mavinga was born in Meaux, Greater Paris, to an Angolan mother and a DR Congolese father. He began his football career at CA Combs-la-Ville, a local club in nearby Combs-la-Ville. He spent seven years at the club and, in 2004, departed for amateur outfit US Sénart-Moissy. The following year, Mavinga joined ES Viry-Châtillon and played on the club's under-16 team. While playing at Viry-Châtillon, Mavinga played in an under-16 league match against the youth academy of Paris Saint-Germain in Paris. He impressed the professional club's scouts and, following the season, was offered a deal to join the club on an aspirant (youth) contract. Mavinga agreed to the move and joined the club in June 2006. Prior to signing with Paris Saint-Germain, he was approached by English club Liverpool. Mavinga was inserted onto the club's under-18 team and helped the squad reach the Championnat National under-18 championship match where they were defeated by the under-18 team of Marseille.

Liverpool
During the 2008–09 season, Mavinga began training with the senior team of Paris Saint-Germain. However, during his stint with the team, he grew frustrated at the lack of guidance from the club's youth structure, as well as the unapproachable attitude of a few senior team players. In June 2009, Mavinga was again contacted by Liverpool, who stated their interest in the player without offering a contract. While waiting on Liverpool's offer, Mavinga also awaited an offer from Paris Saint-Germain, however the latter's offer did not meet the player's expectations. On 7 July 2009, Mavinga signed with Liverpool after agreeing to a three-year deal. Prior to the agreement, he was also coveted by Liverpool's league rival Arsenal. Many supporters and members of Paris Saint-Germain attributed Mavinga's move to Liverpool solely for financial reasons, however, Mavinga denounced the notion by stating that he joined the English club simply for sporting reasons. He also blamed his departure on the firing of Paris Saint-Germain's former manager Paul Le Guen with whom he shared a good relationship. Upon his arrival at Liverpool, Mavinga was placed onto the club's reserve team and played in the Premier Reserve League. During the latter part of the 2009–10 season, he began training with the club's senior team.

On 23 August 2010, Mavinga admitted that he was frustrated at his lack of playing time on the senior team stating that, following the firing of Rafa Benítez, he was relegated back to training full-time with the reserve team by new manager Roy Hodgson.

Loan to Genk 
On 21 December 2010, the Belgian media reported that Belgian Pro League club Genk had acquired Mavinga on loan for the rest of the season. Despite initial speculation of Mavinga verbally agreeing to join Turkish club Antalyaspor, the move to Genk was completed on 11 January 2011. On 13 February, Mavinga made his professional debut appearing as a substitute in a 2–0 victory over Standard Liège. On 17 May, Mavinga broke the jaw and fractured the nose of Standard Liège player Mehdi Carcela-Gonzalez after accidentally kicking him in the face during the match.

Rennes
On 19 July 2011, Mavinga returned to France signing a four-year contract with Rennes. The transfer fee was priced at £1 million and Mavinga was assigned the number 3 shirt. On the opening game of the season, Mavinga made his debut for Rennes in a 4–0 loss against Montpellier. He since would be often used in first team in and out in his first season, having his playing time reduced and would be unused substitute in the matches. At the end of the season, Mavinga soon had a falling out with manager Frédéric Antonetti after taking exception to being made to train separately from the group.

The following season, Belgian Pro League club Racing Genk, his former club he played whilst on loan, renewed their interests signing him and made a bid on him. However, Rennes rejected a bid for Mavinga, insisting Genk increase their bid for worth about four or six million euros for him. Instead, Genk ended their interest signing Mavinga, by signing Brian Hamalainen. Shortly after this, Mavinga would soon be more often, with his increased of playing time, playing in the left-back position. After his suspension from the national team, Mavinga, along with Rennes teammate Yann M'Vila, was suspended until further notice on 19 October and ordered to train with the youth team. Their action was even threatened by Antonetti, with sidelined the pair until the end of the season. Among criticised the duo are general manager Pierre Dréossi, believing they disrespect football. Mavinga would make his return until 3 November 2012, as Rennes win 1–0 against Stade Reims and since retain his first team place in defense. On 15 February 2013, Mavinga made a mistake, scoring the own-goal, as Rennes lose 2–0 against Lille.

Rubin Kazan
On 7 August 2013, Mavinga agreed to join Russian side Rubin Kazan, for a reported fee of €5 million. He joined on a four-year contract, where he played with former Rennes teammate Yann M'Vila.

He made his full league debut in an away match at Ural Sverdlovsk Oblast on 31 August 2013. Rubin won the game 3–0, in which Chris put in a man of the match display at left back, breaking up Ural attacks and setting up Rubin ones. He limped off injured late on.

Toronto FC
On 30 January 2017, Mavinga agreed to join Canadian MLS side Toronto FC. He agreed to a three-year contract.

On 8 March 2018, Toronto re-signed Mavinga to a multi-year contract extension.

LA Galaxy
On 5 January 2023, Mavinga joined Major League Soccer side LA Galaxy on a deal through 2024.

International career
Mavinga was a French youth international and have earned caps with both the under-18 and under-19 teams. He made his youth international debut on 25 March 2009 in the under-18 team's friendly match against Germany in Markranstädt. France won the match 4–3. On 13 June, Mavinga was a part of the team that contested England in a 4–2 victory. The match was played at Wembley Stadium in front of 15,000 spectators and the victory resulted in the team being presented the Fallenhero Trophy by The Football Association chairman Trevor Brooking. With the under-19 team, Mavinga was a regular call up of coach Francis Smerecki often starting in the centre back position alongside Johan Martial or Sébastien Faure. He made his under-19 debut on 9 October 2009 in 4–2 defeat to the Netherlands. After consistently appearing with the team for the campaign, on 7 June 2010, he was named to coach Smerecki's 18-man squad to participate in the 2010 European Under-19 Football Championship. He featured in four of the team's five matches including the final match against Spain, which France won 2–1. The title is the country's second UEFA Under-19 championship.

Due to France's victory at the UEFA Under-19 championship, the nation qualified for the 2011 U-20 World Cup, which merited under-20 team appearances for Mavinga. He made his debut with the team on 7 October 2010 in a friendly match against Portugal, which ended 3–3. Mavinga, subsequently, appeared in three matches for the team during the 2010–11 campaign and, on 10 June 2011, was named to the 21-man squad to participate in the U-20 World Cup. During the week leading up to the team's first match, Mavinga suffered an ankle injury during a training session. The injury was deemed serious and Mavinga was forced to drop out of the squad, which resulted in the player missing the competition.

In November 2012, Mavinga was suspended from national teams until 31 December 2013 for disciplinary reasons.

Later, he decided to not to represent France, but the DR Congo instead. He made his in 2015 and has appeared in five games for his country since.

Career statistics

Club

Honours

Club
Genk
 Belgian Pro League: 2010–11

Toronto FC
 MLS Cup: 2017
 Supporters' Shield: 2017
 Canadian Championship: 2017, 2018
 Trillium Cup: 2017, 2019

International
France
 UEFA European Under-19 Championship: 2010

References

External links

 
 
 
 
 
 

1991 births
Living people
People from Meaux
French people of Angolan descent
French sportspeople of Democratic Republic of the Congo descent
Footballers from Seine-et-Marne
Association football defenders
French footballers
Democratic Republic of the Congo footballers
US Sénart-Moissy players
ES Viry-Châtillon players
Paris Saint-Germain F.C. players
K.R.C. Genk players
Liverpool F.C. players
Stade Rennais F.C. players
FC Rubin Kazan players
Stade de Reims players
ES Troyes AC players
Toronto FC players
LA Galaxy players
Ligue 1 players
Belgian Pro League players
Russian Premier League players
Major League Soccer players
France under-21 international footballers
France youth international footballers
Democratic Republic of the Congo international footballers
French expatriate footballers
French expatriate sportspeople in England
Expatriate footballers in England
French expatriate sportspeople in Belgium
Expatriate footballers in Belgium
French expatriate sportspeople in Russia
Expatriate footballers in Russia
Democratic Republic of the Congo expatriate sportspeople in Canada
French expatriate sportspeople in Canada
Expatriate soccer players in Canada
Black French sportspeople